An iceberg is a large piece of ice that has broken off from a snow-formed glacier or ice shelf, and is floating in open water.

Iceberg or Iceburg may also refer to:

Brands and enterprises 
 Iceberg (fashion house), an Italian luxury fashion house
 Iceberg Interactive, a Dutch video game publisher
 Iceberg Vodka, a brand of Canadian vodka

Fictional characters
 Iceberg (comics), a character in Amalgam Comics superhero
 Iceberg (Transformers), a Mini-Con from Transformers: Armada
 Iceberg (G.I. Joe), a character on G.I. Joe: A Real American Hero
 Iceberg, a Spider-Man foe that works for the Kingpin

Literature
 Iceberg (Banks novel), a David Banks novel based on Doctor Who
 Iceberg (Cussler novel), a Dirk Pitt novel by Clive Cussler
"The Iceberg", a poem by Edwin John Pratt
"The Iceberg", a 1934 poem by C. G. D. Roberts

Music

Groups 
 Iceberg, Deke Leonard's progressive rock band

Albums 
 The Iceberg/Freedom of Speech... Just Watch What You Say!, a 1989 album by Ice-T
 The Iceberg (Oddisee album) (2017)
 Iceberg, a 2007 EP by Kodigo Norte
 Iceberg, a 1986 album by Krisma
 Iceberg, a 1973 album by Deke Leonard

Songs 
 "Iceberg", a song by 10cc from How Dare You!
 "Iceberg", a song by Baby Bird from Fatherhood
 "Iceberg", a song by Børns from Blue Madonna
 "Iceberg", a song by the Lovely Feathers from My Best Friend Daniel
 "Iceberg", a song by Alla Pugacheva from Akh, kak khochetsya zhit
 "Iceberg", a song by Tweet from It's Me Again

People 
 Yung Berg or Iceberg (born 1985), American rapper from Chicago
 Edward Chastain or Iceberg, professional wrestler

Plants 
 Iceberg lettuce, a lettuce cultivar
 Rosa Iceberg, a rose cultivar

Visual art
 The Icebergs, a 1861 painting by Frederic Edwin Church
 The Iceberg (1891 painting), a painting by Frederic Edwin Church

Other uses
 Iceberg (orca)
 Iceberg Theory, a writing style
 Operation Iceberg, codename for Battle of Okinawa

People with the nickname
 Iceberg Slim or Robert Beck (1918–1992), African-American pimp and author 
 Iceberg Slimm or Duane Dyer (born 1978), a Black British rapper and founder of Frojak Entertainment
 Iceberg Slim (musician) or Olusegun Olowokere, a Nigerian rapper

See also 
 Ice Mountain (disambiguation)